The 2013 European Rallycross Championship was the thirty seventh season of the FIA European Championships for Rallycross Drivers. The season consisted of nine rounds and started on 31 March with the British round at Lydden Hill Race Circuit. The season ended on 21 September, at Germany at Estering.

Calendar

Entries

Supercar

Super1600

TouringCar

Championship standings

Supercar
(key)

Super1600
(key)

TouringCar
(key)

References

External links

 

European Rallycross Championship
European Rallycross Championship
European Rallycross Championship seasons